The Jewish community of Greater Columbus has made up a small but noteworthy part of the region since the arrival of Jews in 1840. The community has gone through periods of growth, especially in the last quarter of the 20th century. Today, the well-established community includes schools, temples, elder care facilities, kosher food services, ritual baths, social clubs, community religious learning centers and other organizations and has a population of approximately 25,500, as of the most recent 2013 study. It is the 43rd largest Jewish community in the United States and the third largest in Ohio, trailing Cleveland and Cincinnati.

History
The Jewish community in Columbus began with the settlement of the Nusbaums and the Gundersheimers in 1840, six years after the city's 1834 establishment. Like Cleveland's first Jews, these immigrants came from Bavaria.  4 synagogues were created in the 19th century; B’nai Jeshurun, Temple Israel, Agudas Achim, and Beth Jacob.  After World War II, many Jews moved east into Bexley, Berwick, and Eastmoor, where many Jews and Jewish organizations remain today. Between 1975 and 2000, the Jewish population grew by 60%. A factor in this growth was the immigration of Soviet Jews after the fall of the Soviet Union in 1991. About 1,400 of these immigrants came to Columbus during this period. Today the population of 25,500 contributes to numerous local Jewish organizations. The modern Jewish community is based mostly in New Albany, Bexley, Gahanna, and certain neighborhoods in the city of Columbus.

Jewish Institutions
The community is home to many types of Jewish Institutions including schools, temples, and organizations. JewishColumbus is a leading organization and is a result of the merger of the Columbus Jewish Federation and the Columbus Jewish Foundation
Synagogues in the region include:
 Ahavas Sholom - Orthodox, Bexley
 Agudas Achim - Traditional-Egalitarian, Bexley
 Beth Jacob Synagogue - Orthodox, Columbus
 Beth Tikvah - Reform, Worthington
 Temple Beth Shalom - Reform, New Albany 
 Temple Israel - Reform, Columbus
 Tifereth Israel - Conservative, Columbus
 Torat Emet - Orthodox, Bexley
The Lori Schottenstein Chabad Center - New Albany
The Torah Center - Orthodox, Bexley
Chabad of Downtown Columbus - Downtown, Columbus
Ohio State Hillel - Ohio State University 
Schottenstein Chabad House at OSU - Ohio State University
Columbus Community Kollel - Orthodox, Bexley
There are two Jewish schools, Columbus Torah Academy, an Orthodox K-12 school, and Columbus Jewish Day School, a K-6 Jewish Day School. In addition, there is a JCC, the Wexner Heritage Village retirement home, and several Jewish cemeteries.

Notable People

 Amy Acton, Director of the Ohio Department of Health
 Nate Ebner, NFL Player for the New England Patriots, US Olympian
 Michael Feinstein, Grammy nominated singer
 David Goodman, Former Member of the Ohio Senate and the Ohio House of Representatives
 Bob Greene, Journalist
 Paul Palnik, artist
 Josh Radnor, actor and director
 Jay Schottenstein, businessman and philanthropist
 Jerome Schottenstein, noted businessman and philanthropist, patriarch of Schottenstein family
 Robert Shamansky, U.S. Representative from 1981 to 1983
 R.L. Stine, author
 Les Wexner, businessman and philanthropist, Richest person in Ohio
Ross Friedman, Harvard and Major League Soccer player 
Robert W. Schiff, founder and chairman of Shoe Corporation of American (SCOA) 
Herbert Glimcher, founder of Glimcher Realty Trust.

References 

Columbus
Jews and Judaism in Ohio
History of Columbus, Ohio
Jews